The Park Place disaster occurred on August 22, 1891, in New York City when benzene vapor from a bronze powder manufacturer ignited, causing an explosion that resulted in the collapse of the five-story Taylor Building that housed the manufacturer along with other businesses. Two fires then broke out, one in the ruins of the manufacturer and the other in a restaurant that was caused by a natural gas leak. The disaster killed 61 people, while local residents were admonished in the press for rubbernecking and general insensitivity. A grand jury declined to indict any of the owners or occupants of the building, however legislation was introduced in the New York State Assembly that sought to tighten the building code in light of this disaster and the 1892 Hotel Royal fire.

References

Explosions in 1891 
Building collapses in the United States
History of New York City
August 1891 events
1891 in New York City
1891 disasters in the United States
Disasters in New York City